The 2006 Pilot Pen Tennis is a tennis tournament played on outdoor hard courts. It was the 22nd edition of the Pilot Pen Tennis, and is part of the International Series of the 2006 ATP Tour, and of the Tier II Series of the 2006 WTA Tour. It took place at the Cullman-Heyman Tennis Center in New Haven, United States, from August 20 through August 26, 2006.

Finals

Men's singles

 Nikolay Davydenko def.  Agustín Calleri 6–4, 6–3.

Women's singles

 Justine Henin def.  Lindsay Davenport 6–0, 1–0 ret.

Men's doubles

 Jonathan Erlich /  Andy Ram def.  Mariusz Fyrstenberg /  Marcin Matkowski 6–3, 6–3.

Women's doubles

 Yan Zi /  Zheng Jie def.  Lisa Raymond /  Samantha Stosur 6–4, 6–2.

External links
 Official website
 Men's Singles draw
 Men's Doubles draw
 Men's Qualifying Singles draw
 Women's Singles, Doubles and Qualifying Singles Draws

Pilot Pen Tennis
Pilot Pen Tennis
2006
Pilot Pen Tennis
Pilot Pen Tennis
Pilot Pen Tennis
 
Pilot Pen Tennis